David Morris is a Canadian retired soccer defender who played professionally in the USL First Division.  He was the 1999 USL Premier Development League Rookie of the Year.

Morris attended, and played soccer, at Capilano College.  In 1996, Capilano won the Canadian college championship.  Morris was the tournament MVP.  In 1999, Morris signed with the Abbotsford 86ers of the USL Premier Development League.  His outstanding play, fourteen goals in fifteen games, led to his selection as the USL PDL Rookie of the Year.  It also led to his being called up to the Vancouver 86ers five times that season.  In 2000, Morris made a permanent move to Vancouver where he played until 2007.  After his retirement from professional soccer, Morris continued playing for Pegasus FC in the Vancouver Metro Soccer League.

References

Living people
1978 births
Canadian soccer players
Fraser Valley Mariners players
USL League Two players
USL First Division players
A-League (1995–2004) players
Vancouver Whitecaps (1986–2010) players
Capilano University alumni
Sportspeople from Burnaby
Association football defenders